The Nokia X6 is a music-oriented capacitive touchscreen smartphone and portable entertainment device by Nokia. It was announced in early September 2009 during Nokia World 2009 in Germany.

The X6 replaces the Nokia 5800 as Nokia's flagship music-centred model. Both still slot below the high-end touchscreen model Nokia N97. The X6 was Nokia's first with a capacitive touchscreen.

The X6 and the Nokia X3-00 are the first devices in newly installed Nokia Xseries. Before the Xseries, Nokia's music-centred devices were branded XpressMusic. With the X6 (and the X3 introduced same day), Nokia launched its new simpler naming strategy with just one number after the series letter.

Release
The original X6 includes the Comes With Music program and a licence for unlimited free downloads from the Nokia Music Store. The Comes With Music version shipped in late 2009 for an estimated retail price of £529.99 or €605.

The name is later reused by HMD global for a new Android smartphone, the Nokia X6 (2018)

Hardware revisions
A version without Comes With Music support at €200 less was released on 23 February 2010. This version has 16 GB of on-board storage. Another cheaper variation of the X6 also without Comes With Music support was released by Nokia in mid-2010. This version has 8 GB of on-board storage and was released in Asia and North America. The 32 GB version was not released in India instead the 8 GB and 16 GB versions were provided with Ovi Music Unlimited offer.

Appearance
The X6 is notable for its slimmer body than the 5800 (13.8 mm) and 35 hours of continuous music playback and its fast 3g network. For social networking, it supports easy access to Facebook, MySpace, Ovi, Yahoo IM, YouTube, VK, Windows Live and more.

Features
 WCDMA, GPRS/EDGE, HSDPA up to 3.6 Mbit/s
 Size: 111 × 51 × 13.8 mm
 Display:  16:9 widescreen nHD, 231 ppi, capacitive touchscreen.
 Scratch-resistant screen
 Integrated and Assisted GPS
 5-megapixel camera with auto-focus and Carl Zeiss optics, dual LED flash
 High speed Micro-USB connector (Micro-B receptacle)
 Wireless LAN (WLAN)

Other services, features or applications
 Image and video editor, Video centre, Online Share, Download (where Ovi Store is not supported), Email Settings wizard, Switch, Playlist DJ, Nokia Maps 3.0, Embedded premium game Spore, Online Search, Email clients
 OVI services: Nokia Music Store, Ovi Store, Nokia Messaging, Ovi Maps, Ovi Share, Ovi Contacts, Ovi Files, Ovi Suite 1.1 for PC
 Downloadable Symbian (sis), Java applications, and widgets
 3 games included: Spore by EA, Asphalt4 and DJ Mix Tour by Gameloft

Operating times
 Talk time: Up to 9 hours
 Standby time: Up to 406 hours
 Music playback: up to 35 hours
 Video playback: up to 4 hours

Firmware updates
A new software update has been released for Nokia X6-00, version 40.0.002, which brings a new version of Ovi Maps and Ovi Store, improved browser and improved chat in Ovi Contacts.

 New web browser version 7.3.1.33
 Updated Mail for Exchange
 Updated Shazam
 Usability improvements
 Smileys in Messaging
 Swipe to unlock screen and keys

However the updates are not possible via the phone and require a Windows computer to perform. Nokia was willing to update the devices by mail for those that did not have a Windows PC.

Unofficial
Hobbyists have provided unofficial Symbian Anna firmware releases.

In 2014, enthusiast of Symbian^1 generation Nokia smartphones release last update of his firmware modification for 10 different models of Nokia smartphones.

Reception
The Inquirer reviewed the Nokia X6-00 and rated it 8 out of 10. It called it a much better all round device than the Nokia 5800 XpressMusic.

See also
 Nokia Maps
 Nokia PC Suite
 Nokia Software Updater
 symbian

References

Sources
 Official Nokia UK page
 Nokia forum page with more details 
 https://web.archive.org/web/20110927221218/http://www.infosyncworld.com/reviews/cell-phones/nokia-x6/10482.html
 https://www.pcmag.com/article2/0,2817,2352501,00.asp
 https://www.mirror.co.uk/news/technology/2009/09/09/techie-breakie-nokia-x6-gran-turismo-5-115875-21659774/
 http://www.guardian.co.uk/technology/blog/2009/sep/02/nokia-x6-n97-launch

External links

X6
Mobile phones introduced in 2009
Mobile phones with user-replaceable battery
Nokia XSeries